Fabio Bencivenga (born 20 January 1976 in Curti) is a retired water polo player from Italy, who represented his native country at three consecutive Summer Olympics, starting in 1996 (Mars, Sol). He was a member of the Men's National Team that claimed the bronze medal in 1996.

See also
 Italy men's Olympic water polo team records and statistics
 List of Olympic medalists in water polo (men)
 List of players who have appeared in multiple men's Olympic water polo tournaments
 List of World Aquatics Championships medalists in water polo

References
 Profile

External links
 
 

1976 births
Living people
Sportspeople from the Province of Caserta
Italian male water polo players
Water polo players at the 1996 Summer Olympics
Water polo players at the 2000 Summer Olympics
Water polo players at the 2004 Summer Olympics
Water polo players at the 2008 Summer Olympics
Olympic water polo players of Italy
Olympic bronze medalists for Italy
Olympic medalists in water polo
World Aquatics Championships medalists in water polo
Medalists at the 1996 Summer Olympics